Sepp Rogger (19 August 1915 – 6 October 2011) was a Swiss speed skater. He competed in two events at the 1948 Winter Olympics.

References

External links
 

1915 births
2011 deaths
Swiss male speed skaters
Olympic speed skaters of Switzerland
Speed skaters at the 1948 Winter Olympics
People from Davos
Sportspeople from Graubünden